Palpifer tavoyanus is a moth of the family Hepialidae. It is found in Myanmar.

References

Moths described in 1886
Hepialidae